Fouad Tobagi is a Professor in the Stanford Department of Electrical Engineering.

Education
Fouad Tobagi received the Engineering Diploma from Ecole Centrale des Arts et Manufactures, Paris, France, in 1970. He completed MS (1971) and PhD (1974) in Computer science at the University of California, Los Angeles (UCLA).

Academic career
Fouad Tobagi joined the Stanford Department of Electrical Engineering faculty in 1977. At that time, he was also part of the Computer Systems Lab (CSL).

Fouad Tobagi was the director of the Stanford Computer Forum (SCF) from 2001 to 2004

In 2019, Professor Tobagi is the Associate Chair of Graduate Education in Electrical Engineering, where he is responsible for curriculum, student progress, teaching assistants and their training.

Research
Professor Tobagi's current interests include voice and video communication over the internet, wireless and mobile networks, network design and provisioning, and network resource management. Past research interests include:
 packet radio
 satellite networks
 local area networks
 fast packet switching
 multimedia networking 
 networked video services
 multimedia applications

Awards and honors
 2016, Inaugural Test of Time Award from SIGMOBILE
 1998, Kuwait Prize in Applied Sciences (Informatics), administered by the Kuwait Foundation for the Advancement of Science
 1985, Fellow of the Institute of Electrical and Electronics Engineers (IEEE)

External links
Stanford profiles, Fouad Tobagi's page

References

Stanford University Department of Electrical Engineering faculty
Living people
Stanford University School of Engineering faculty
Stanford University faculty
University of California, Los Angeles alumni
Year of birth missing (living people)